The 1985–86 Marist Red Foxes men's basketball team represented Marist College in the 1985–86 NCAA Division I men's basketball season. The Red Foxes, led by second-year head coach Matthew Furjanic Jr., played their home games at the James J. McCann Recreation Center in Poughkeepsie, New York as members of the ECAC Metro Conference. They finished the season 19–12, 11–5 in ECACM play to finish in second place. As the No. 2 seed in the ECAC tournament, they advanced to the championship game, where they defeated top-seeded Fairleigh Dickinson 57–56 in overtime to win the school's first ECAC Metro men's basketball tournament title. The Red Foxes earned the automatic bid to the 1986 NCAA tournament, receiving a 15 seed in the Southeast region. They were defeated in the first round 53–68 by No. 6 Georgia Tech.

Previous season
The Red Foxes finished the 1984–85 season 17–12 overall, 11–3 in ECACM play to finish in first place, winning the ECACM regular season championship. As the No. 1 seed in the ECAC tournament, the Red Foxes advanced to the semifinals where they were defeated by No. 4 seed Loyola (MD) 55–56 in double overtime.

Roster

Schedule and results

|-
!colspan=9 style="background:#B31B1B; color:#FFFFFF;"| Regular season

|-
!colspan=9 style="background:#B31B1B; color:#FFFFFF;"|ECAC Metro tournament
|-

|-
!colspan=9 style="background:#B31B1B; color:#FFFFFF;"|NCAA tournament
|-

Source

References

Marist Red Foxes men's basketball seasons
Marist
Marist Red Foxes men's basketball
Marist Red Foxes men's basketball
Marist